Kaloplocamus gulo is a species of sea slug, a nudibranch, a shell-less marine gastropod mollusk in the family Polyceridae.

Distribution 
This species was described from a depth of 100 metres off São Paulo, Brazil as a species of Plocamopherus. It was transferred to the genus Kaloplocamus in 1988 as it lacks the club-like extra-branchial appendages characteristic of Plocamopherus species.

References

Polyceridae
Gastropods described in 1979